Lorcan Allen (born 27 March 1940) is an Irish farmer and former Fianna Fáil politician.

Allen was elected to Dáil Éireann as a Fianna Fáil TD for the Wexford constituency at the 1961 general election. Aged 21 years and 6 months at the time, he is the third youngest ever TD. He held his seat in 6 succeeding general elections until his defeat at the November 1982 general election. He also unsuccessfully contested the next two general elections.

When Charles Haughey appointed his first Government in December 1979, Allen became a Minister of State, appointed to the Department of Agriculture, a position he retained in the short-serving 1982 Government.

Allen was a member of Wexford County Council from 1985 to 2009, and of Gorey Town Council from 1999 to 2014.

References

1940 births
Living people
Fianna Fáil TDs
Members of the 17th Dáil
Members of the 18th Dáil
Members of the 19th Dáil
Members of the 20th Dáil
Members of the 21st Dáil
Members of the 22nd Dáil
Members of the 23rd Dáil
Politicians from County Wexford
Local councillors in County Wexford
20th-century Irish farmers
Ministers of State of the 23rd Dáil
Ministers of State of the 21st Dáil
People from Gorey
21st-century Irish farmers